Tiffany Hendra is an American actress and television personality best known for the Bravo reality-television show The Real Housewives of Dallas.

Life and career
Hendra was born in Channelview, Texas, a Houston suburb. She worked as a fashion model throughout Europe and the US before becoming an actress and spokesperson. She started in television doing sketches on The X Show on FX and went on to co-host two seasons of the Comedy Central show Beat the Geeks, airing in 2001 and 2002. Hendra was a regular on NBC's Spy TV. She starred in the Cinemax erotic-drama series Black Tie Nights and the Bravo reality-television show The Real Housewives of Dallas.

Bolton married to rock musician Aaron Hendra in February 2004. She is the sister of Survivor: Micronesia - Fans vs. Favorites fourth-place finisher Natalie Bolton.

References

External links

1971 births
Living people
People from Houston
Female models from Texas
American television actresses
The Real Housewives cast members
21st-century American women